Attorney General Ireland may refer to:

Gail L. Ireland (1895–1988), Attorney General of Colorado
Richard Davies Ireland (1816–1877), Attorney-General of Victoria

See also
Attorney General of Ireland, the modern office
Attorney-General for Ireland, the pre-independence office